Enzo Gragnaniello (born 20 October 1954) is an Italian singer-songwriter and composer.

Life and career 
Born in Quartieri Spagnoli, Naples, Gragnaniello began playing the guitar at the age of 12 and began composing his first songs at 18 years old.  In 1977 he formed the group "Banchi nuovi", named after the Committee of unemployed people to which he belonged.

Gragnaniello made his solo debut in 1983, with the eponymous album Enzo Gragnaniello. In 1986 he received his first Targa Tenco, an award he won again in 1990 and 1999 and in 2020. In 1991 his song "Cu'mmè", recorded by Roberto Murolo and Mia Martini, obtained a great commercial success and became instant classics in Italy; in 1997 with the same song Gragnaniello won the music festival "Viva Napoli". In 1999 he entered the competition at the Sanremo Music Festival in a duet with Ornella Vanoni, ranking fourth with the song "Alberi".

Gragnaniello composed songs for Andrea Bocelli, Adriano Celentano, Gerardina Trovato among others. He is also active as a composer of musical scores for stage plays and films.

Discography

Album 

     1983 - Enzo Gragnaniello 
     1985 - Salita Trinità degli Spagnoli 
     1990 - Fujente
     1991 - Veleno mare e ammore
     1993 - Un mondo che non c'è
     1994 - Cercando il sole
     1996 - Posteggiatore abusivo
     1996 - Continuerò
     1998 - Neapolis mantra
     1998 - Canzoni di rabbia canzoni d'amore
     1999 - Oltre gli alberi
     1999 - Dai Quartieri al S.Carlo
     2001 - Balìa
     2003 - Tribù e passione (with James Senese)
     2003 - The Best of Enzo Gragnaniello
     2005 - Quanto mi costa
     2007 - L'Erba Cattiva
     2011 - Radice
     2013 - Live
2015 - Misteriosamente
2019 - Lo chiamavano vient' 'e terra
2021 - Rint’ ‘o posto sbagliato

References

External links 

 Enzo Gragnaniello at Discogs

1954 births
Italian male singers
Living people
Musicians from Naples
Italian singer-songwriters
Italian pop singers
Italian folk singers
Italian film score composers
Italian male film score composers
Italian rock singers